Arnaud Boetsch and Guy Forget were the defending champions, but lost in the final to Sergio Casal and Emilio Sánchez. The score was 6–1, 6–4.

Seeds

Draw

Draw

References

External links
 Official results archive (ATP)
 Official results archive (ITF)

1992 ATP Tour
ATP Bordeaux